Sethani Ghat is a 19th-century construction along the banks of the river Narmada at Narmadapuram in Madhya Pradesh in India. It is one of the largest ghats in India. During Narmada Jayanti celebrations the ghat comes alive when thousands of people converge on the ghats and diyas are floated in the river. The ghat was built after generous contributions by Jankibai Sethani from the Sharma family in Hoshangabad after devotees complained to her about the difficulty in getting to the river, Hence the ghat is named after her. It is one of the few examples of public infrastructure built through private funding in India. A photo of Narmada from Sethani ghat can be seen in the book Jungle Rahe Taki Narmada Bahe!, by Pankaj Srivastava.

References 

 Gazetier, Hoshangabad District, Govt. of India

External links 
 http://www.hindu.com/thehindu/gallery/0092/009201.jpg
 https://web.archive.org/web/20070928223932/http://madhyapradeshtourism.com/site_seeing.asp?id=d22
 http://www.india9.com/i9show/31016.htm

Buildings and structures in Madhya Pradesh
Hoshangabad
Ghats of India
Religion in Madhya Pradesh
Tourist attractions in Hoshangabad district